The 2008 New York Mets season was the franchise's 47th season. The Mets finished the season with an 89–73 record, second place in the National League East, three games behind the Philadelphia Phillies, and one game worse than the wild card winners, the Milwaukee Brewers. The Mets were eliminated from postseason play on their last day of the regular season by the Florida Marlins for the second straight year, which also left New York without a team in the postseason for the first time since 1993, as the crosstown rival Yankees were eliminated from contention just five days prior.

2008 was the Mets' 45th and final year at Shea Stadium. They moved to Citi Field in 2009.

Offseason
After dropping 12 out of their final 17 games of the 2007 season to lose the National League East to the Philadelphia Phillies on their last day of the regular season, the Mets front office was expected to make big moves in the offseason to give hope for the next season.

Needing to make a decision within five days after the Mets' last game, Tom Glavine declined his $13 million player option. He eventually signed with his former team, the Atlanta Braves, agreeing to a one-year contract worth $8 million on November 18.

On October 31, the Mets took care of two of their own potential free agents. Left fielder Moisés Alou's option year on his contract was picked up for $7.5 million despite Alou only playing in 87 games due to a left quadriceps injury. He did, however, lead the Mets with a .341 batting average and seven outfield assists. Alou also set a franchise record with a 30-game hitting streak after he came off the disabled list. Utility player Damion Easley was re-signed for one year at $950,000. He was on the disabled list two separate times due to a left quadriceps strain on May 11 and a left ankle sprain which ended his season on August 18.

When the free agency period began, the Mets first looked to catcher Yorvit Torrealba to replace 2007 starter Paul Lo Duca. After agreeing to the structure of a three-year contract worth $14.4 million with Torrealba, the Mets suddenly changed their minds on November 17 and retracted the offer, seemingly because of Torrealba's sore shoulder, as the Mets only needed to see the results of Torrealba's physical to officially complete the deal. Lo Duca never appeared to be the first choice for the Mets, so they continued their search for a starter from another team rather than re-sign Lo Duca, who went on to sign with the Nationals.

After the Torrealba deal fell through, the Mets focused on one of their own free agents. On November 18, second baseman Luis Castillo agree to a four-year $25 million contract. The Mets explored the possibility of signing David Eckstein to start at second base, but determined his contract demands were too lofty.

On November 20, the Mets traded relief pitcher Guillermo Mota away to the Milwaukee Brewers for catcher Johnny Estrada. This trade ended up just being a salary dump, as Estrada, who was arbitration-eligible, was not offered a new contract, therefore becoming a free agent. The Mets wanted to be rid of Mota and his $3.2 million salary because he pitched to a 5.72 ERA in 2007 after being suspended for 50 games for steroid use.

In response to the Mets' need for a starting catcher, General Manager Omar Minaya made his first significant trade of the offseason on December 1, acquiring catcher Brian Schneider and outfielder Ryan Church from the Nationals for outfielder Lastings Milledge. Once considered the Mets top prospect, Milledge had fallen out of favor with players and management due to his on- and off-field antics. Minaya made the trade to acquire two players who, in his mind, would be starters for the Mets.

The Mets made a small move on January 5, 2008, to shore up their outfield depth, acquiring Ángel Pagán from the Chicago Cubs for two minor-league players, outfielder Corey Coles and pitcher Ryan Meyers. Pagán was a fourth-round draft pick by the Mets in 1999, and he was sent to the Cubs on January 25, 2006, for cash.

The Mets' biggest trade of the offseason would come on January 29, when they agreed to a trade for two-time Cy Young Award-winning pitcher Johan Santana from the Minnesota Twins. Minaya agreed to trade outfielder Carlos Gómez and pitchers Philip Humber, Kevin Mulvey, and Deolis Guerra to the Twins. Three days later, to complete the trade, Santana agreed to a contract extension worth $137.5 million over the course of six years, with an option worth an extra $19.5 million for 2014, which can be triggered by performance. This contract is a record amount for a Major League Baseball pitcher.

Starting pitcher Óliver Pérez's arbitration case was settled on February 22 and scored a win for Pérez, as the Mets found out they would have to pay him $6.5 million for the 2008 season. This gave Pérez a raise of over $4 million and was $1.775 million more than the Mets offered to pay him.

Another player signed during the offseason was relief pitcher Duaner Sánchez. Sánchez missed all of 2007 due to a broken bone in his left shoulder suffered during a taxi accident in 2006, but the Mets hoped he could still return to be an important part of the bullpen, signing him to a one-year deal at $850,000.

Players who made it to the Mets in 2008 after being signed to minor-league contracts include pitcher Tony Armas Jr., catcher Robinson Cancel, and utility player Fernando Tatís.

Spring training
The Mets entered spring training with questions about their pitching staff due to injury and age. Duaner Sánchez was still recovering from his shoulder injury, and older starters Pedro Martínez and Orlando Hernández were coming off of seasons when they missed significant time due to injury. Martínez made it to Opening Day healthy, but Sánchez and Hernández opened the regular season on the disabled list.

During spring training, the team suffered several injuries to players that they had pegged to play with the Mets when the season opened on March 31. On March 1, Ryan Church collided with Marlon Anderson while trying to catch a fly ball, leaving Church with a concussion and Anderson with a bruised sternum. Ramón Castro aggravated his right hamstring injury on March 16, ending up with a sprain. It was more severe than first thought, keeping Castro out of play through the beginning of the season. Carlos Beltrán and Luis Castillo were late to start playing because they were both still recovering from offseason knee surgery, while Moisés Alou was held out of action because of hernia surgery. Other players suffered minor injuries that held them out of many exhibition games, but they returned before the first game that counted.

John Maine had the strongest spring training performance from the pitching staff, leading all National League pitchers with a 1.53 ERA. Maine went 3–1 over  innings, with 33 strikeouts and five walks. Ángel Pagán was a surprising force on offense, batting .329 to win the starting left field competition that was open due to Alou's injury.

Coming out of spring training, the Mets set their starting rotation with Johan Santana, Martínez, Maine, Óliver Pérez, and Mike Pelfrey in place of Hernández. The bullpen consisted of Billy Wagner, Aaron Heilman, Pedro Feliciano, Scott Schoeneweis, Matt Wise, and Joe Smith, who beat Brian Stokes for a spot on the roster. Brian Schneider, Carlos Delgado, Castillo, José Reyes, David Wright, Pagán, Beltrán, and Church started in the field.

Anderson, Damion Easley, and Endy Chávez were set as the bench players, joined by Brady Clark and Raul Casanova due to Alou's and Castro's injuries. These decisions caused Rubén Gotay to lose his spot on the roster after playing in 98 games in 2007, so the Mets placed him on waivers, where he was claimed by the Atlanta Braves on March 28.

Regular season

Bullpen  problems
The weakest part of the Mets team was their bullpen, which struggled throughout the season. If all the games played by the Mets ended after the 8th inning the team would have won the NL East by 12 games.

Roster changes
On June 13, 2008, the Mets acquired Trot Nixon via trade from the Arizona Diamondbacks.  The move was deemed necessary due to multiple injuries in the Mets outfield.
The Mets fired manager Willie Randolph as well as pitching coach Rick Peterson and first base coach Tom Nieto just two hours after the team's 9–6 victory over the Los Angeles Angels of Anaheim on Monday, June 16, 2008. They were replaced by interim manager Jerry Manuel and coaches Ken Oberkfell, Dan Warthen, and Luis Aguayo.

Season standings

Record vs. opponents

Roster

Game log

|-  style="text-align:center; background:#bfb;"
| 1 || March 31 || @ Marlins || 7–2 || Santana (1–0) || Hendrickson (0–1) || || 38,308 || 1–0
|-

|-  style="text-align:center; background:#fbb;"
| 2 || April 1 || @ Marlins || 5–4 (10)|| J. Miller (1–0) || Wise (0–1) || || 15,117 || 1–1
|-  style="text-align:center; background:#bfb;"
| 3 || April 2 || @ Marlins || 13–0 || Pérez (1–0) || A. Miller (0–1) || || 13,720 || 2–1
|-  style="text-align:center; background:#bbb;"
| — || April 4 || @ Braves || colspan=6|Postponed (rain) Rescheduled for May 20
|-  style="text-align:center; background:#fbb;"
| 4 || April 5 || @ Braves || 11–5 || Hudson (1–0) || Maine (0–1) || || 36,130 || 2–2
|-  style="text-align:center; background:#fbb;"
| 5 || April 6 || @ Braves || 3–1 || Smoltz (1–0) || Santana (1–1) || Soriano (1) || 39,414 || 2–3
|-  style="text-align:center; background:#fbb;"
| 6 || April 8 || Phillies || 5–2 || Moyer (1–0) || Schoeneweis (0–1) || Gordon (1) || 56,350 || 2–4
|-  style="text-align:center; background:#bfb;"
| 7 || April 9 || Phillies || 8–2 || Pelfrey (1–0) || Kendrick (1–1) || ||47,127 || 3–4
|-  style="text-align:center; background:#bfb;"
| 8 || April 10 || Phillies || 4–3 (12) || Sosa (1–0) || Gordon (0–2) || || 49,049 || 4–4
|-  style="text-align:center; background:#bfb;"
| 9 || April 11 || Brewers || 4–2 || Figueroa (1–0) || Parra (1–1) || Wagner (1) || 46,214 || 5–4
|-  style="text-align:center; background:#fbb;"
| 10 || April 12 || Brewers || 5–3 || Sheets (2–0) || Santana (1–2) || Gagné (2) || 54,701 || 5–5
|-  style="text-align:center; background:#fbb;"
| 11 || April 13 || Brewers || 9–7 || Torres (2–0) || Sosa (1–1) || Gagné (3) || 52,794 || 5–6
|-  style="text-align:center; background:#bfb;"
| 12 || April 15 || Nationals || 6–0 || Pelfrey (2–0) || Pérez (0–3) || || 46,567 || 6–6
|-  style="text-align:center; background:#bfb;"
| 13 || April 16 || Nationals || 5–2 || Maine (1–1) || Chico (0–3) || Wagner (2) || 46,106  || 7–6
|-  style="text-align:center; background:#bfb;"
| 14 || April 17 || Nationals || 3–2 (14) || Sosa (2–1) || Hanrahan (0–1) || || 47,785 || 8–6
|-  style="text-align:center; background:#bfb;"
| 15 || April 18 || @ Phillies || 6–4 || Santana (2–2) || Hamels (2–2) || Wagner (3) || 45,156 || 9–6
|-  style="text-align:center; background:#bfb;"
| 16 || April 19 || @ Phillies || 4–2 || Pérez (2–0) || Moyer (1–1) || Wagner (4) ||  45,149 || 10–6
|-  style="text-align:center; background:#fbb;"
| 17 || April 20 || @ Phillies || 5–4 || Romero (1–0) || Feliciano (0–1) || Lidge (3) || 45,173 || 10–7
|-  style="text-align:center; background:#fbb;"
| 18 || April 21 || @ Cubs || 7–1 || Zambrano (3–1) || Maine (1–2) || || 40,582 || 10–8
|-  style="text-align:center; background:#fbb;"
| 19 || April 22 || @ Cubs || 8–1 || Lilly (1–3) || Figueroa (1–1) || || 40,503 || 10–9
|-  style="text-align:center; background:#bfb;"
| 20 || April 23 || @ Nationals || 7–2 ||  Santana (3–2) || Redding (3–2) || || 32,780 || 11–9
|-  style="text-align:center; background:#fbb;"
| 21 || April 24 || @ Nationals || 10–5 || O'Connor (1–0) || Pérez (2–1) || || 29,750 || 11–10
|-  style="text-align:center; background:#fbb;"
| 22 || April 25 || Braves || 6–3 || Jurrjens (3–2) || Pelfrey (2–1) || || 52,495 || 11–11
|-  style="text-align:center; background:#bfb;"
| 23 || April 26 || Braves || 4–3 || Maine (2–2) || Hudson (3–2) || Wagner (5) || 51,339 || 12–11
|-  style="text-align:center; background:#bfb;"
| 24 || April 27 || Braves || 6–3 || Figueroa (2–1) || Smoltz (3–2) || Wagner (6) || 53,487 || 13–11
|-  style="text-align:center; background:#bbb;"
| — || April 28 || Pirates || colspan=6|Postponed (rain) Rescheduled for August 11
|-  style="text-align:center; background:#bfb;"
| 25 || April 29 || Pirates || 5–4 (11)|| Sosa (3–1) || Van Benschoten (0–1) || || 46,982 || 14–11
|-  style="text-align:center; background:#fbb;"
| 26 || April 30 || Pirates || 13–1 || Gorzelanny (2–3) || Pérez (2–2) || || 46,788 || 14–12
|-

|-  style="text-align:center; background:#bfb;"
| 27 || May 2 || @ Diamondbacks || 7–2 || Maine (3–2) || Owings (4–1) || || 35,682 || 15–12
|-  style="text-align:center; background:#fbb;"
| 28 || May 3 || @ Diamondbacks || 10–4 || Webb (7–0) || Pelfrey (2–2) || || 34,744 || 15–13
|-  style="text-align:center; background:#bfb;"
| 29 || May 4 || @ Diamondbacks || 5–2 || Sosa (4–1) || Qualls (0–2) || Wagner (7) || 37,593 || 16–13
|-  style="text-align:center; background:#fbb;"
| 30 || May 5 || @ Dodgers || 5–1 || Billingsley (2–4) || Pérez (3–2) || || 44,181 || 16–14
|-  style="text-align:center; background:#fbb;"
| 31 || May 6 || @ Dodgers || 5–4 || Kuo (2–1) || Figueroa (2–2) || Saito (5) || 43,927 || 16–15
|-  style="text-align:center; background:#bfb;"
| 32 || May 7 || @ Dodgers || 12–1 || Maine (4–2) || Penny (5–3) || || 40,696 || 17–15
|-  style="text-align:center; background:#bbb;"
| — || May 9 || Reds || colspan=6|Postponed (rain) Rescheduled for May 10 
|-  style="text-align:center; background:#bfb;"
| 33 || May 10 || Reds || 12–6 || Santana (4–2) || Belisle (1–3) || || 55,186 || 18–15
|-  style="text-align:center; background:#fbb;"
| 34 || May 10 || Reds || 7–1 || Arroyo (2–4) || Pelfrey (2–3) || || 47,673 || 18–16
|-  style="text-align:center; background:#bfb;"
| 35 || May 11 || Reds || 8–3 || Pérez (3–3) ||  Cueto (2–4) || || 49,264 || 19–16
|-  style="text-align:center; background:#fbb;"
| 36 || May 12 || Nationals || 10–4 || Pérez (1–3) || Figueroa (2–3) || || 45,321 || 19–17
|-  style="text-align:center; background:#bfb;"
| 37 || May 13 || Nationals || 6–3 || Maine (5–2) || Lannan (3–4) || Wagner (8) || 46,618 || 20–17
|-  style="text-align:center; background:#fbb;"
| 38 || May 14 || Nationals || 5–3 || Redding (5–3) || Vargas (0–1) || Rauch (8) || 48,529 ||20–18
|-  style="text-align:center; background:#fbb;"
| 39 || May 15 || Nationals || 1–0 || Bergmann (1–1) || Pelfrey (2–4) || Rauch (9) || 51,769 || 20–19
|-  style="text-align:center; background:#bbb;"
| — || May 16 || @ Yankees || colspan=6|Postponed (rain) Rescheduled for June 27
|-  style="text-align:center; background:#bfb;"
| 40 || May 17 || @ Yankees || 7–4 || Santana (5–2) || Pettitte (3–5) || Wagner (9) || 55,093 || 21–19
|-  style="text-align:center; background:#bfb;"
| 41 || May 18 || @ Yankees || 11–2 || Pérez (4–3) || Wang (6–2) || || 55,012 || 22–19
|-  style="text-align:center; background:#fbb;"
| 42 || May 20 || @ Braves || 6–1 || Glavine (2–1) || Maine (5–3) || || 26,873 || 22–20
|-  style="text-align:center; background:#fbb;"
| 43 || May 20 || @ Braves || 6–2 || Campillo (1–0) || Vargas (0–2) || Acosta (3) || 25,590 || 22–21
|-  style="text-align:center; background:#fbb;"
| 44 || May 21 || @ Braves || 11–4 || Jurrjens (5–3) || Pelfrey (2–5)|| || 30,335 || 22–22
|-  style="text-align:center; background:#fbb;"
| 45 || May 22 || @ Braves || 4–2 || Hudson (7–3) || Santana (5–3) || Ohman (1) || 30,348 || 22–23
|-  style="text-align:center; background:#fbb;"
| 46 || May 23 || @ Rockies || 6–5 (13)|| Buchholz (2–2) || Heilman (0–1) || || 33,341 || 22–24
|-  style="text-align:center; background:#bfb;"
| 47 || May 24 || @ Rockies || 9–2 || Vargas (1–2) || Francis (1–5) || || 38,142 || 23–24
|-  style="text-align:center; background:#fbb;"
| 48 || May 25 || @ Rockies || 4–1 || Cook (7–3) || Maine (5–4) || || 42,123 || 23–25
|-  style="text-align:center; background:#fbb;"
| 49 || May 26 || Marlins || 7–3 || Nolasco (4–3)|| Pelfrey (2–6)|| || 51,489 || 23–26
|-  style="text-align:center; background:#bfb;"
| 50 || May 27 || Marlins || 5–3 || Santana (6–3)|| A. Miller (4–4)|| Wagner (10)|| 47,093 || 24–26
|-  style="text-align:center; background:#bfb;"
| 51 || May 28 || Marlins || 7–6 (12)|| Sánchez (1–0) || J. Miller (1–2)|| || 47,769 || 25–26
|-  style="text-align:center; background:#bfb;"
| 52 || May 29 || Dodgers || 8–4 || Vargas (2–2) || Penny (5–6) || || 52,886 || 26–26
|-  style="text-align:center; background:#fbb;"
| 53 || May 30 || Dodgers || 9–5 || Park (2–1) || Heilman (0–2) || || 52,176 || 26–27
|-  style="text-align:center; background:#bfb;"
| 54 || May 31 || Dodgers || 3–2 || Sánchez (2–0) || Broxton (2–2) || Wagner (11) || 53,528 || 27–27
|-

|-  style="text-align:center; background:#bfb;"
| 55 || June 1 || Dodgers || 6–1 || Santana (7–3) || Kuroda (2–5)|| || 50,263 || 28–27
|-  style="text-align:center; background:#fbb;"
| 56 || June 2 || @ Giants || 10–2 || Sánchez (4–3) || Pérez (4–4) || || 36,126 || 28–28
|-  style="text-align:center; background:#bfb;"
| 57 || June 3 || @ Giants || 9–6 || P. Martínez (1–0) || Zito (1–9) || Wagner (12) || 35,228 || 29–28
|-  style="text-align:center; background:#bfb;"
| 58 || June 4 || @ Giants || 5–3 || Maine (6–4) || Cain (2–4) || Wagner (13) || 35,646 || 30–28
|-  style="text-align:center; background:#fbb;"
| 59 || June 5 || @ Padres || 2–1 || Hoffman (1–4) || Schoeneweis (0–2)|| || 28,867 || 30–29
|-  style="text-align:center; background:#fbb;"
| 60 || June 6 || @ Padres || 2–1 || Wolf (4–4) || Santana (7–4) || Hoffman (13) || 27,749 || 30–30
|-  style="text-align:center; background:#fbb;"
| 61 || June 7 || @ Padres || 2–1 (10) || Adams (1–0) || Feliciano (0–2) || || 38,972 || 30–31
|-  style="text-align:center; background:#fbb;"
| 62 || June 8 || @ Padres || 8–6 || Guevara (1–0) || Wagner (0–1) || Hoffman (14) || 31,992 || 30–32
|-  style="text-align:center; background:#fbb;"
| 63 || June 10 || Diamondbacks || 9–5 || Qualls (1–5) || Smith (0–1) || || 45,808 || 30–33
|-  style="text-align:center; background:#bfb;"
| 64 || June 11 || Diamondbacks || 5–3 (13) || Vargas (3–2) || González (1–3) || || 46,503 || 31–33
|-  style="text-align:center; background:#fbb;"
| 65 || June 12 || Diamondbacks || 5–4 (10) || Lyon (2–1) || Heilman (0–3) || || 47,042 || 31–34
|-  style="text-align:center; background:#bfb;"
| 66 || June 13 || Rangers || 7–1 || Pérez (5–4) || Feldman (1–3) || || 49,880 || 32–34
|-  style="text-align:center; background:#bbb;"
| — || June 14 || Rangers || colspan=6|Postponed (rain) Rescheduled for June 15
|-  style="text-align:center; background:#fbb;"
| 67 || June 15 || Rangers || 8–7 || Millwood (5–3) || Maine (6–5) || Wilson (13) || 55,438 || 32–35
|-  style="text-align:center; background:#bfb;"
| 68 || June 15 || Rangers || 4–2 || P. Martínez (2–0) || Gabbard (1–3) || Wagner (14) || 55,438 || 33–35
|-  style="text-align:center; background:#bfb;"
| 69 || June 16 || @ Angels || 9–6 || Pelfrey (3–6) || Weaver (6–7) || Wagner (15) || 39,229 || 34–35
|-  style="text-align:center; background:#fbb;"
| 70 || June 17 || @ Angels || 6–1 || Lackey (4–1) || Santana (7–5) || Shields (2) || 40,122 || 34–36
|-  style="text-align:center; background:#bfb;"
| 71 || June 18 || @ Angels || 5–4 (10)|| Sánchez (3–0) || Speier (0–4) || Wagner (16) || 43,138 || 35–36
|-  style="text-align:center; background:#bfb;"
| 72 || June 20 || @ Rockies || 7–2 || Maine (7–5) || Cook (10–4) || || 30,411 || 36–36
|-  style="text-align:center; background:#fbb;"
| 73 || June 21 || @ Rockies || 7–1 || Jiménez (2–7) || P. Martínez (2–1) || || 35,637 || 36–37
|-  style="text-align:center; background:#bfb;"
| 74 || June 22 || @ Rockies || 3–1 || Pelfrey (4–6) || Reynolds (2–5) || Wagner (17) || 45,019 || 37–37
|-  style="text-align:center; background:#fbb;"
| 75 || June 23 || Mariners || 5–2 || Rowland-Smith (2–1) || Santana (7–6) || Rhodes (1) || 49,789 || 37–38
|-  style="text-align:center; background:#fbb;"
| 76 || June 24 || Mariners || 11–0 || Dickey (2–3) || Pérez (5–5) || || 49,386 || 37–39
|-  style="text-align:center; background:#bfb;"
| 77 || June 25 || Mariners || 8–2 || Maine (8–5) || Batista (3–10) || || 52,154 || 38–39
|-  style="text-align:center; background:#bfb;"
| 78 || June 27 || @ Yankees || 15–6 || Pelfrey (5–6)  || Giese (1–3) || || 54,978 || 39–39
|-  style="text-align:center; background:#fbb;"
| 79 || June 27 || Yankees || 9–0 || Ponson (5–1) || P. Martínez (2–2) || || 56,308 || 39–40
|-  style="text-align:center; background:#fbb;"
| 80 || June 28 || Yankees || 3–2 || Pettitte (9–5) || Santana (7–7) || Rivera (22) || 56,172 || 39–41
|-  style="text-align:center; background:#bfb;"
| 81 || June 29 || Yankees || 3–1 || Pérez (6–5) || Rasner (4–6) || Wagner (18) || 56,277 || 40–41
|-  style="text-align:center; background:#fbb;"
| 82 || June 30 || @ Cardinals || 7–1 || Lohse (10–2)  ||  Maine (8–6) ||  || 42,206 || 40–42
|-

|-  style="text-align:center; background:#bfb;"
| 83 || July 1 || @ Cardinals || 7–4 || Armas (1–0) || Wellemeyer (7–3) || Wagner (19) || 42,425 || 41–42
|-  style="text-align:center; background:#fbb;"
| 84 || July 2 || @ Cardinals || 8–7 || Franklin (3–2) || Muñiz (0–1) || || 40,995 || 41–43
|-  style="text-align:center; background:#bfb;"
| 85 || July 3 || @ Cardinals ||11–1 ||Pelfrey (6–6) ||Boggs (3–1) || ||43,099 || 42–43
|-  style="text-align:center; background:#fbb;"
| 86 || July 4 || @ Phillies || 3–2 || Lidge (2–0) || Sánchez (3–1) || || 44,922 || 42–44
|-  style="text-align:center; background:#bfb;"
| 87 || July 5 || @ Phillies || 9–4 || Feliciano (1–2) || Romero (4–2) || || 45,190 || 43–44
|-  style="text-align:center; background:#bfb;"
| 88 || July 6 || @ Phillies || 4–2 (12) || Smith (1–1) || Durbin (2–2) || || 45,203 || 44–44
|-  style="text-align:center; background:#bfb;"
| 89 || July 7 || @ Phillies || 10–9 || P. Martínez (3–2) || Eaton (3–7) || Wagner (20) || 44,655 || 45–44
|-  style="text-align:center; background:#bfb;"
| 90 || July 8 || Giants || 7–0 || Pelfrey (7–6) || Lincecum (10–2)|| || 48,887 || 46–44
|-  style="text-align:center; background:#bfb;"
| 91 || July 9 || Giants || 5–0 || Santana (8–7) || Sánchez (8–5) || || 48,896 || 47–44
|-  style="text-align:center; background:#bfb;"
| 92 || July 10 || Giants || 7–3 || Schoeneweis (1–2) || Romo (0–1) || || 48,755 || 48–44
|-  style="text-align:center; background:#bfb;"
| 93 || July 11 || Rockies || 2–1 || Feliciano (2–2) || Buchholz (3–3) || Wagner (21)|| 49,016 || 49–44
|-  style="text-align:center; background:#bfb;"
| 94 || July 12 || Rockies || 3–0 || Muñiz (1–1) || Jiménez (4–9) || Wagner (22) || 54,137 || 50–44
|-  style="text-align:center; background:#bfb;"
| 95 || July 13 || Rockies || 7–0 || Pelfrey (8–6) || Redman (2–5) || || 51,293 || 51–44
|-  style="text-align:center; background:#bfb;"
| 96 || July 17 || @ Reds || 10–8 || Sánchez (4–1) || Cordero (4–2) || Wagner (23) || 23,681 || 52–44
|-  style="text-align:center; background:#fbb;"
| 97 || July 18 || @ Reds || 5–2 || Arroyo (8–7) || Maine (8–7) || Cordero (20) || 31,922 || 52–45
|-  style="text-align:center; background:#fbb;"
| 98 || July 19 || @ Reds || 7–2 || Fogg (2–2) || Pérez (6–6) || || 41,959 || 52–46
|-  style="text-align:center; background:#bfb;"
| 99 || July 20 || @ Reds || 7–5 (10) || Sánchez (5–1) || Bray (2–1) || Wagner (24) || 31,195 || 53–46
|-  style="text-align:center; background:#fbb;"
| 100 || July 22 || Phillies || 8–6 || Durbin (3–2) || Smith (1–2) || Lidge (22) || 55,081 || 53–47
|-  style="text-align:center; background:#bfb;"
| 101 || July 23 || Phillies || 6–3 || Maine (9–7) || Madson (2–1) || Wagner (25) || 53,444 || 54–47
|-  style="text-align:center; background:#bfb;"
| 102 || July 24 || Phillies || 3–1 || Heilman (1–3) || Romero (4–3) || Wagner (26) || 50,962 || 55–47
|-  style="text-align:center; background:#bfb;"
| 103 || July 25 || Cardinals || 7–2|| Pelfrey (9–6) || Boggs (3–2) || || 55,372 || 56–47
|-  style="text-align:center; background:#fbb;"
| 104 || July 26 || Cardinals || 10–8 (14)|| Thompson (3–2) || Heilman (1–4) || || 53,799 || 56–48
|-  style="text-align:center; background:#bfb;"
| 105 || July 27 || Cardinals || 9–1 || Santana (9–7) || Lohse (12–3) || || 53,691 || 57–48
|-  style="text-align:center; background:#fbb;"
| 106 || July 28 || @ Marlins || 7–3 || Waechter (3–2) || Smith (1–3) || || 23,165 || 57–49
|-  style="text-align:center; background:#bfb;"
| 107 || July 29 || @ Marlins || 4–1 || Pérez (7–6) || Olsen (6–6) || Wagner (27) || 25,032 || 58–49
|-  style="text-align:center; background:#fbb;"
| 108 || July 30 || @ Marlins || 7–5 || Johnson (1–0) || Pelfrey (9–7) || Gregg (23) || 25,902 || 58–50
|-

|-  style="text-align:center; background:#fbb;"
| 109 || August 1 || @ Astros || 7–3 || Brocail (5–5) || Heilman (1–5) || || 41,083 || 58–51
|-  style="text-align:center; background:#fbb;"
| 110 || August 2 || @ Astros || 5–4 || Valverde (5–3) || Heilman (1–6) || || 39,152 || 58–52
|-  style="text-align:center; background:#fbb;"
| 111 || August 3 || @ Astros || 4–0 || Wolf (7–10) || Pérez (7–7) || || 38,602 || 58–53
|-  style="text-align:center; background:#bfb;"
| 112 || August 5 || Padres || 6–5 || Pelfrey (10–7) || Adams (1–1) || Schoeneweis (1) || 52,130 || 59–53
|-  style="text-align:center; background:#fbb;"
| 113 || August 6 || Padres || 4–2 || Baek (4–6) || P. Martínez (3–3) || Hoffman (24) || 48,018 || 59–54
|-  style="text-align:center; background:#bfb;"
| 114 || August 7 || Padres || 5–3 || Heilman (2–6) || Bell (6–5) || || 49,352 || 60–54
|-  style="text-align:center; background:#bfb;"
| 115 || August 8 || Marlins || 3–0 || Pérez (8–7) || Nolasco (11–7) || Heilman (1) || 50,307 || 61–54
|-  style="text-align:center; background:#bfb;"
| 116 || August 9 || Marlins || 8–6 || Schoeneweis (2–2) || Olsen (6–7) || Heilman (2) || 52,484 || 62–54
|-  style="text-align:center; background:#fbb;"
| 117 || August 10 || Marlins || 8–2 || Johnson (3–0) || Pelfrey (10–8) || || 54,242 || 62–55
|-  style="text-align:center; background:#fbb;"
| 118 || August 11 || Pirates || 7–5 || D. Bautista (4–2) || Heilman (2–7) || Grabow (2) || 53,534 || 62–56
|-  style="text-align:center; background:#bfb;"
| 119 || August 12 || @ Nationals || 4–3 || Santana (10–7) || Rivera (3–5) || Feliciano (1) || 32,186 || 63–56
|-  style="text-align:center; background:#bfb;"
| 120 || August 13 || @ Nationals || 12–0 || Maine (10–7) || Bergmann (2–9) || Stokes (1) || 30,814 || 64–56
|-  style="text-align:center; background:#bfb;"
| 121 || August 14 || @ Nationals || 9–3 || Pérez (9–7) || Balester (2–5) || || 31,058 || 65–56
|-  style="text-align:center; background:#bfb;"
| 122 || August 15 || @ Pirates || 2–1 || Pelfrey (11–8) || Davis (1–2) || Heilman (3) || 36,418 || 66–56 
|-  style="text-align:center; background:#bfb;"
| 123 || August 16 || @ Pirates || 7–4 || P. Martínez (4–3) || Duke (4–11)  || Feliciano (2) || 37,506 || 67–56
|-  style="text-align:center; background:#bfb;"
| 124 || August 17 || @ Pirates || 4–0 || Santana (11–7) || Karstens (2–2) || || 36,483 || 68–56
|-  style="text-align:center; background:#fbb;"
| 125 || August 18 || @ Pirates || 5–2 || Burnett (1–1) || Feliciano (2–3) || Grabow (4) || 19,066 || 68–57
|-  style="text-align:center; background:#bfb;"
| 126 || August 19 || Braves || 7–3 || Heilman (3–7) || Bennett (2–5) || || 50,589 || 69–57
|-  style="text-align:center; background:#bfb;"
| 127 || August 20 || Braves || 6–3 || Pelfrey (12–8) || Jurrjens (11–9) || || 50,178 || 70–57
|-  style="text-align:center; background:#bfb;"
| 128 || August 21 || Braves || 5–4 || Ayala (2–8) || Núñez (0–1) || || 51,952 || 71–57
|-  style="text-align:center; background:#bfb;"
| 129 || August 22 || Astros || 3–0 || Santana (12–7) || Oswalt (11–9) || Ayala (1) || 52,008 || 72–57
|-  style="text-align:center; background:#fbb;"
| 130 || August 23 || Astros || 8–3 || Backe (8–12) || Maine (10–8) || || 51,766 || 72–58
|-  style="text-align:center; background:#fbb;"
| 131 || August 24 || Astros || 6–4 (10) || Hawkins (3–1) || Feliciano (2–4) || Valverde (33) || 49,758 || 72–59
|-  style="text-align:center; background:#bfb;"
| 132 || August 25 || Astros || 9–1 || Pelfrey (13–8) || Moehler (9–5) || || 49,791 || 73–59
|-  style="text-align:center; background:#fbb;"
| 133 || August 26 || @ Phillies || 8–7 (13) || Seánez (5–3) || Schoeneweis (2–3) || || 45,204 || 73–60
|-  style="text-align:center; background:#bfb;"
| 134 || August 27 || @ Phillies || 6–3 || Stokes (1–0) || Seánez (5–4) || Ayala (2) || 45,138 || 74–60
|-  style="text-align:center; background:#bfb;"
| 135 || August 29 || @ Marlins || 5–4 || Smith (2–3) || Gregg (6–8) || Ayala (3) || 20,043 || 75–60
|-  style="text-align:center; background:#fbb;"
| 136 || August 30 || @ Marlins || 4–3 || Lindstrom (2–2) || Heilman (3–8) || || 28,830 || 75–61
|-  style="text-align:center; background:#bfb;"
| 137 || August 31 || @ Marlins || 6–2 || P. Martínez (5–3) || Olsen (6–9) || || 16,123 || 76–61
|-

|-  style="text-align:center; background:#bfb;"
| 138 || September 1 || @ Brewers || 4–2 || Figueroa (3–3) || Gagné (4–3) || Ayala (4) || 41,476 || 77–61
|-  style="text-align:center; background:#bfb;"
| 139 || September 2 || @ Brewers || 6–5 (10) || Smith (3–3) || Torres (6–4) || Ayala (5) || 36,587 || 78–61
|-  style="text-align:center; background:#bfb;"
| 140 || September 3 || @ Brewers || 9–2 || Pérez (10–7) || Bush (9–10) || || 26,236 || 79–61
|-  style="text-align:center; background:#fbb;"
| 141 || September 5 || Phillies || 3–0 || Myers (9–10) || Pelfrey (13–9) || Lidge (34) || 48,302 || 79–62
|-  style="text-align:center; background:#bbb;"
| — || September 6 || Phillies || colspan="6" | Postponed (rain) Rescheduled for September 7
|-  style="text-align:center; background:#fbb;"
| 142 || September 7 || Phillies || 6–2 || Moyer (13–7)  || P. Martínez (5–4)
|| || 55,797 || 79–63
|-  style="text-align:center; background:#bfb;"
| 143 || September 7 || Phillies || 6–3 || Santana (13–7)  || Hamels (12–9)  || || 54,980 || 80–63
|-  style="text-align:center; background:#bfb;"
| 144 || September 9 || Nationals || 10–8 || Smith (4–3)  || Manning (1–3) || Ayala (6) || 50,382 || 81–63
|-  style="text-align:center; background:#bfb;"
| 145 || September 10 || Nationals || 13–10 || Smith (5–3)  || Rivera (5–6) || Ayala (7)  || 52,431 || 82–63
|-  style="text-align:center; background:#bbb;"
| — || September 12 || Braves || colspan="6" | Postponed (rain) Rescheduled for September 13
|-  style="text-align:center; background:#fbb;"
| 146 || September 13 || Braves || 3–2 || Ridgway (1–0) || Schoeneweis (2–4) || González (10) || 54,705 || 82–64
|-  style="text-align:center; background:#bfb;"
| 147 || September 13 || Braves || 5–0 || Niese (1–0) || Reyes (3–11) || || 54,705 || 83–64
|-  style="text-align:center; background:#fbb;"
| 148 || September 14 || Braves || 7–4 || Julio (2–0) || Ayala (2–9) || | González (11) || 56,041 || 83–65
|-  style="text-align:center; background:#fbb;"
| 149 || September 15 || @ Nationals || 7–2 || Lannan (9–13) || P. Martínez (5–5) || || 21,759 || 83–66
|-  style="text-align:center; background:#fbb;"
| 150 || September 16 || @ Nationals || 1–0 || Pérez (7–10) || Pelfrey (13–10) || Hanrahan (9) || 24,997 || 83–67
|-  style="text-align:center; background:#bfb;"
| 151 || September 17 || @ Nationals || 9–7 || Knight (1–0) || Martis (0–3) || Ayala (8) || 25,019 || 84–67
|-  style="text-align:center; background:#bfb;"
| 152 || September 18 || @ Nationals || 7–2 || Santana (14–7) || Redding (10–10)  || || 25,426 || 85–67
|-  style="text-align:center; background:#bfb;"
| 153 || September 19 || @ Braves || 9–5 || Feliciano (3–4) || Tavárez (1–4) || || 42,803 || 86–67
|-  style="text-align:center; background:#fbb;"
| 154 || September 20 || @ Braves || 4–2 || Campillo (8–7)  || P. Martínez (5–6) || González (12) || 50,124 || 86–68
|-  style="text-align:center; background:#fbb;"
| 155 || September 21 || @ Braves || 7–6 || Julio (3–0)  || Schoeneweis (2–5) || González (13) || 49,222 || 86–69
|-  style="text-align:center; background:#fbb;"
| 156 || September 22 || Cubs || 9–5 ||Marquis (11–9) || Niese (1–1) || Wood (33) || 51,137 || 86–70
|-  style="text-align:center; background:#bfb;"
| 157 || September 23 || Cubs || 6–2 || Santana (15–7) || Gaudin (4–2) || Ayala (9) || 50,615  || 87–70
|-  style="text-align:center; background:#fbb;"
| 158 || September 24 || Cubs || 9–6 || Howry (7–4) || Ayala (2–10) || Wood (34) || 54,416 || 87–71
|-  style="text-align:center; background:#bfb;"
| 159 || September 25 || Cubs || 7–6 || Smith (6–3) || Hart (2–2) ||  || 51,174 || 88–71
|-  style="text-align:center; background:#fbb;"
| 160 || September 26 || Marlins || 6–1 || Volstad (6–4) || Pelfrey (13–11) || || 49,545 || 88–72
|-  style="text-align:center; background:#bfb;"
| 161 || September 27 || Marlins || 2–0 || Santana (16–7) || Nolasco (15–8) || || 54,920 || 89–72
|-  style="text-align:center; background:#fbb;"
| 162 || September 28 || Marlins || 4–2 || Nelson (3–1) || Schoeneweis (2–6) || Lindstrom (5) || 56,059 || 89–73
|-

Player stats

Batting
Legend: G = Games played; AB = At-bats; H = Hits; BA = Batting average; OBP = On-base percentage; HR = Home runs; RBI = Runs batted in; R = Runs scored; SB = Stolen bases; bold = league leader

Pitching
Legend: G = Games pitched; GS = Games started; IP = Innings pitched; W = Wins; L = Losses; SV = Saves; ERA = Earned run average; H = Hits allowed; SO = Strikeouts; BB = Walks; S = Saves; bold = league leader

Farm system

References

External links

2008 New York Mets season at Baseball Reference

New York Mets seasons
New York Mets
New York Mets
2000s in Queens